José Miguel Silva Esteves (born 28 May 1990 in Leiria) known as Zé Miguel, is a Portuguese footballer who plays for União Leiria as a forward.

Football career
On 2 August 2015, Zé Miguel made his professional debut with Olhanense in a 2015–16 Taça da Liga match against Penafiel.

References

External links

Stats and profile at LPFP 

1990 births
Living people
People from Leiria
Portuguese footballers
Association football forwards
S.C. Olhanense players
Sportspeople from Leiria District